The Bridewell Taxis (later The Bridewells) were an English, Leeds-based indie rock group, active from 1987 to 1993. The Bridewell Taxis were briefly known as one of the few bands from east of the Pennines to make an impact on what was to become known as the Madchester scene.

Early years
The group came together in Leeds during 1987 and were originally called Morality Play. Their first public performances were at an Unemployed Music project in Leeds that also helped launch other contemporary Leeds collaborations including Nightmares on Wax and Demo. At that time, Mick Roberts had been working on song lyrics and ideas with childhood friend John Halnon and Marcus Waite. After Mick Roberts joined, the band changed its name to The Bridewell Taxis, a nickname for local police vans.

Their first gig was in 1988 at the Royal Park and their first release was a blue flexi-disc, "Lies" c/w "Just Good Friends", which was given away for free with a local fanzine.

Releases
Their first EP, Just Good Friends, was released on their own Stolen Records label in autumn, 1989. It reached number 18 on the UK Indie Chart. Their second single was "Give In" c/w "Whole Damn Nation" which featured a dance remix of the latter track. The band started headlining their own gigs and became regulars at venues such as the Warehouse in Leeds, The Boardwalk in Manchester and The Leadmill in Sheffield.

Their debut LP "Invisible To You" was a collection of previous Stolen Records releases with two new tracks. It was launched at a home town concert at Leeds Town Hall on 5 July which was also filmed for a video release. Despite its relative lack of new material, "Invisible" sold well and remained in the indie charts for six weeks.

Despite guitarist Sean McElhone announcing he was leaving, a pre-Christmas concert was booked at the Warehouse, Leeds on 11 December. The concert was poorly attended and beset with technical problems. The band left the stage to boos from their home town audience and split up that night.

The Bridewells

After the breakup of the original line up, Mick Roberts, Carl A. Finlow and Alaric Neville continued to write and play together. Following a request for a Motown cover version from Imaginary Records Chris Walton re-joined. Marvin Gaye's Inner City Blues was demoed along with a handful of new songs. A cassette of the session found its way to Phil Manzanera, Roxy Music guitarist, studio and label owner. 

The Bridewells played their first gig at the Warehouse, Leeds on 17 February 1992. An EP, "Smile I Still Care" was recorded at Phil Manzanera's studio in Chertsey, West London and was released on Expression Records on 15 June. The album "Cage" was also released by Expression on 19 October.

It had become apparent during the recording of the album that Mick's loss of hearing was having an adverse effect on the volume he needed for monitoring and live gigs were becoming difficult. This combined with financial troubles at Expression effectively brought the band to a halt. Their final performance was filmed at the Warehouse for ITV featuring the album title track, "Cage" and a new song "World Stop Turning", taped on 23 March 1993.

In 2005, Mick Roberts, Sean McElhone and Glenn Scullion got back together to play some dates. They were joined by twins James (bass) and Jools Metcalfe (guitar). The band played a sell-out reunion gig in Leeds in October 2005 and followed that with two more home town dates. The following year, the band embarked on a mini-tour, ending with a final show at Leeds University Union. The band split again in June 2006.

Discography

Singles and EPs
Just Good Friends EP ("Just Good Friends", "Too Long", "Wild Boar", "Hold On") (Stolen, 1989)
"Give In" c/w "Whole Damn Nation" (featuring "Whole Dance Nation" remix by Steve and Andy Williams from K-Klass) (Stolen, 1990)
"Honesty" c/w "Aegis" (Stolen, 1990)
"Spirit" (featuring LFO Spirit remix) (Stolen, 1990)
"Don't Fear the Reaper" c/w "Face in the Crowd" (featuring "What Noise Reaper" remix by Chris Nagle) (Stolen, 1991)
Smile EP (as The Bridewells) ("Smile I Still Care", "Missing Link", "World of Lies", "Return") (Expression, 1992)

Albums
Invisible To You (Stolen, 1991)
Cage (as The Bridewells) (Expression, 1992)
Bridewell Revisited
Stolen Sound People (2013)

Videos
Precious Times: A History of The Bridewell Taxis (Stolen, 1990)
Live at The Hacienda (Jettisoundz, 1990)
The Invisible Smile: Live at Leeds Town Hall (Alternative Image, 1991)

Compilation appearances
Indie Chart Hits Vol. 11 - "Spirit" (Beechwood, 1990)
Indie Top 20 Vol. 12 - "Don't Fear the Reaper" (Beechwood, 1991)
Knowing Where It All Leeds - "Moving Fast" (Stolen Sounds, 1991)
The Expression She Pulled 12 - "World Stop Turning" (as The Bridewells) (ESP, 1992)
The Expression She Pulled 14 - "Shame" (as The Bridewells) (ESP, 1993)
United City - "Girl" (as The Bridewells) (Soundcity, 2007)

TV appearance
The Warehouse - "Cage" and "World Stop Turning" (as The Bridewells) (recorded 23 March, broadcast 30 April, ITV, 1993)

References

Indie rock groups from Leeds
Madchester groups
Musical groups established in 1987